Clusia minutiflora is a species of flowering plant in the family Clusiaceae. It is found only in Ecuador. Its natural habitat is subtropical or tropical moist montane forest.

References

minutiflora
Endemic flora of Ecuador
Data deficient plants
Taxonomy articles created by Polbot